Reece Weslee Humphrey (born July 31, 1986, in Bloomington, Indiana) is retired American freestyle wrestler who competed for the men's freestyle 60 kg at the World Wrestling Championships 2013 in Budapest, Hungary. He was eliminated in the quarterfinal rounds, after being defeated by Iran's Masoud Esmaeilpour, based on the decision score 8–9. He is a 3x national USA wrestling champion in 2011, 2013 and 2015. New York athletic club International Open champion 2011. Humphrey is also Indiana high school state champion, Freestyle and Greco-Roman national champion 2x All-American at The Ohio State University (2009 runner-up and 3rd 2010) In 2015 World Wrestling Championships he won to world bronze medalist Daulet Niyazbekov of Kazakhstan, but in second round he lost to Mongolian young wrestling prospect Batboldyn Nomin, Batboldyn reached to the final, in Repechage round 1 Humphrey lost to bronze world medalist Bajrang Punia of India.

Championships and accomplishments
 Folkstyle:
 2009 NCAA Championships Ohio State – runner-up.
 2010 NCAA Championships Ohio State – 3rd place.
 Freestyle:
 2010 New York athletic club International Open –  4th place.
 2011 Dave Schultz Memorial International – 5th place.
 2011 New York athletic club International Open Champion.
 2011 USA World Team Trials Champion.
 2011 World Wrestling Championships 9th place – 60 kg (Istanbul, Turkey)
 2011 Ukrainian Wrestlers Memorial International 5th place – 60 kg (Kiev, Ukraine)
 2012 New York athletic club International Open runner-up – 60 kg
 2012 Ramzan Kadyrov & Adlan Varayev Cup 5th place – 60 kg (Grozny, Chechnya) 
 2013 USA National Freestyle Wrestling Champion – 60 kg
 2013 USA World Team Trials champion – 60 kg
 2013 World Wrestling Championships 8th place – 60 kg (Budapest, Hungary)
 2014 USA Freestyle Wrestling Championships 5th place – 60 kg
 2014 USA World Team Trials 4th place – 61 kg
 2014 Grand Prix of Paris – 3rd place – 61 kg (Paris, France)
 2015 USA National Freestyle Wrestling Champion – 61 kg
 2015 USA World Team Trials Champion – 61 kg
 2015 Granma y Cerro Pelado International runner-up – 61 kg (Havana, Cuba)
 2015 Dave Schultz Memorial International runner-up – 61 kg
 2015 World Wrestling Championships 12th place – 61 kg
2016 Ukrainian Wrestlers and Coaches Memorial 3rd place – 65 kg

References

1986 births
Sportspeople from Columbus, Ohio
Living people
American male sport wrestlers